The Croatian Film Archive is the national film archive of Croatia. It is a member of the International Federation of Film Archives and of ACE, the Association of European Film Archives and Cinematheques. The archive was founded in 1979.

See also
 Lists of film archives
 Cinema of Croatia

References

External links
Croatian Film Archives

Film archives in Europe
Arts organizations established in 1979
Film organizations in Croatia
Archives in Croatia